Al Khadhraa is a neighborhood of Baghdad, Iraq. 

Khadhraa